The Sümis are a major Naga ethnic group inhabiting the territories of Zünheboto District, parts of Niuland District and Kiphire District in the Northeast Indian state of Nagaland.

Anthropological study of the Sümis is documented in the book The Sema Nagas by J. H. Hutton, who was a Professor of Social Anthropology in the University of Cambridge. The Sümi people are recognised as a Scheduled Tribe (STs) by India.

Religion 
The ancestral religion of the Sümis was the worship of nature. With the arrival of Baptist missionaries in the 20th century, like other Naga ethnic groups, today, Sümis are 99% Christians. Very few of them still practice animism.

Distribution 
Sümi Nagas mostly inhabit the central and southern regions of Nagaland. Zünheboto is the district of the Sümis and they also live in districts such as Chümoukedima, Dimapur,  Kiphire, Kohima, Mokokchung, Niuland, Tuensang, Wokha, etc. There are also seven Sümi villages in Tinsukia District of Assam.

Festivals 

The Sümis celebrate many festivals which have been carried down from generations. Most of these festivals usually mark the beginning of new seasons, harvesting of new crops or victory at war. The two major festivals that are currently popular among them are:

Tülüni 
Tülüni (July 8) is a festival of great significance for the Sümis. This festival is marked with feasts as the occasion occurs in the bountiful season of the year. Drinking rice beer indispensably forms as part of the feasts. Rice beer is served in a goblet made of bamboo or made from the leaf of plantain. Rice Beer is an everyday diet for the Nagas and Sumi Nagas in general. However, Tülüni is not a feast to celebrate or worship Rice beer. Tülüni is also called "Anni" the word of which denotes the season of plentiful crops. This midyear festival is a time of communal harmony and merry-making for the Sümi community. Slaughtering of pigs, cows and mithun is an important feature of this festival. Tülüni, is a festive season which marks season of plenty, a season to bond relationship through marriage ties, settle differences amongst friends and foes. In short, it is a season to mend broken relations and to celebrate togetherness, unity and harmony.

During this festival, the betrothed exchange basketful of gifts with meals. The fiance is invited to a grand dinner at the fiancee's residence. Even siblings of the families of both the bride and groom exchange dinner and packed food and meats - wrapped the traditional way in plantain leaves. It was a time of joy even for servants and housekeepers in the olden days. On this day they were fed extra generously with good food and meat.

The practice of working in groups is common for the Sümi agriculture farmers, and Tülüni is a special time for them because they get to rest and celebrate the completion of a farming season of hard work in their paddy fields. For this festival, the farmer groups (also called Aloji) pool in money or other resources together to exchange/buy pigs and cows to be slaughtered for the special day. The meat is equally divided among themselves and some portion is kept aside for the group feast. In the midst of the feast, group leaders get extra offers of meat by way of feeding them by others. Each working group consists of 20 to 30 in number which includes several women, too. The new recruits are also made to join the group at this grand feast.

The betrothed are settled at this period. The fervours of the feast is synchronised with a chain of folk songs and ballads. In modern times, friends and members from other ethnic groups and communities are invited to attend the feast and are entertained with a variety of traditional songs and dances, they are also served with sumptuous authentic Sümi cuisine of smoked pork and axone with local herbs and vegetables.

By virtue of two separate clans the gennas and rituals differ between Sümi and Tukumi. Among all other festivals and gennas. Sumis, in general, accept the festival of Tülüni as the most grand and important one.

Ahuna 
Ahuna (14 November) is a traditional post-harvest festival of the Sümis. Ahuna signifies the celebration of the season's harvest in Thanksgiving, while invoking the spirit of good fortune in the New Year. On this occasion, the entire community prepares and feasts on the first meal of rice drawn from the season's harvest cooked in bamboo segments. The receptacles for cooking or serving on this occasion are freshly made, curved or cut, from locally available resources prolific and abundant in the countryside.

Ahuna is celebrated on 13 and 14 November and now holds the status of the official festival of the Sümi Nagas because it falls in a dry season and accessibility for visitors in terms of road conditions are better. Tülüni is still the most respected festival for the local Sümi.

Notable people
 Y. Hewoto Awomi, Former politician from Dimapur-II Assembly constituency
 G. Kaito Aye, Cabinet Minister in Nagaland Legislative Assembly
 K. L. Chishi, Former Chief Minister of Nagaland
 Alobo Naga, Musician
 Hokishe Sema (1921–2007), Former Chief Minister of Nagaland and Governor of Himachal Pradesh
 H. K. Sema, Former Supreme Court Judge
 Shikiho Sema (1946–1998), Former Member of Parliament, Lok Sabha
 Isak Chishi Swu (1929–2016), Chairman of NSCN-IM
 Scato Swu (1924–2014), Former Rajya Sabha Member of Parliament from Nagaland
 Kihoto Hollohon Yepthomi (1932–2021), Politician
 Tokheho Yepthomi, Member of Parliament, Lok Sabha
 Jacob Zhimomi, Minister in Nagaland Legislative Assembly
 H. Khekiho Zhimomi (1946–2015), Former Member of Parliament, Rajya Sabha

References

Bibliography/Further reading 
Discovery Channel India. (2017). Last Man Standing. [online] Available at: http://www.discoverychannel.co.in/tv-shows/last-man-standing/ [Accessed 27 May 2017].
 Jacobs, Julian (1999), "The Nagas: Hills People of Northeast India". London: Thames and Hudson.
Jimomi, Inavi (2018), "SUMI NAGA: The Origin and Migration of the Sumi Naga", Dimapur, Heritage Publishing House, 
Hutton. J. H (1921), "THE SEMA NAGAS", Great Britain, MACMILLAN AND CO., LIMITED ST/ MARTIN'S STREET, LONDON.

External links 
 Entry of Sumi Nagas as Ethnologue
 The Sumi or Sema Nagas - Assam Online Portal

Naga people
Headhunting
Scheduled Tribes of Nagaland